"Once in a Lifetime" is a song co-written and recorded by Australian country music artist Keith Urban. It was released in August 2006 as the first single from his 2006 album Love, Pain & the Whole Crazy Thing.  Urban wrote this song with John Shanks.

On the US Billboard Hot Country Songs chart dated for the week of 2 September 2006, the song entered at No. 17, setting what was then a new record for the highest-debuting song in the history of the modern country music charts. The previous record was held by Eddie Rabbitt's "Every Which Way But Loose" and Garth Brooks' "Good Ride Cowboy", both of which debuted at #18 (in 1979 and 2005, respectively).

Track listing
Australian CD single
 "Once in a Lifetime" – 4:17
 ""Days Go By" (live) – 3:48
 "You'll Think of Me" (Jeremy Wheatley Mix) – 3:53
 "You're My Better Half" (live) – 4:05

Personnel
As listed in liner notes.
Keith Urban – lead and backing vocals, lead guitar, acoustic guitar, ganjo, EBow, piano
Tom Bukovac – rhythm guitar
Larry Corbett – cello
Eric Darken – percussion
Rami Jaffee – Hammond B-3 organ
Tim Lauer – synthesizer
Chris McHugh – drums, drum machine programming
Jimmie Lee Sloas – bass guitar
David Stone – upright bass
Russell Terrell – background vocals

Charts

Weekly charts

Year-end charts

Certifications

References

2006 singles
Keith Urban songs
Song recordings produced by Dann Huff
Songs written by John Shanks
Songs written by Keith Urban
Capitol Records Nashville singles
Music videos directed by Chris Hicky
2006 songs